West Coast or west coast may refer to:

Geography

Australia
 Western Australia
West Coast of South Australia
 West Coast, Tasmania
West Coast Range, mountain range in the region

Canada
 British Columbia Coast

China
Huangdao District, literally as West Coast New Area, also known as Qingdao West Coast 
West Coast Economic Zone

Gambia
 West Coast Division (Gambia)

Germany 
 West Coast, Germany

India
 Western part of coastal India
 Malabar coast, south-western India
 Western Coastal Plains

Indonesia
West Coast Regency, Lampung

Isle of Man
West Coast Marine Nature Reserve

Malaysia
 West Coast of Peninsular Malaysia
 West Coast Division, Sabah, east Malaysia (on the island of Borneo)

New Zealand
 West Coast Region, a region in the South Island

Singapore
 West Coast, Singapore
 West Region, Singapore

South Africa
 West Coast District Municipality
 West Coast, Western Cape

Sweden
 Västkusten, the Swedish West Coast, located in Skagerrak and Kattegat and including all of the coast of the provinces of Västergötland, Halland and Bohuslän and part of Scania

United States
 West Coast of the United States
 Western United States (by extension of the above)

Education
West Coast Baptist College, in Lancaster, California
West Coast University, a health-care oriented university in California and Ontario
West Coast University (Panama)

Government
West Coast (New Zealand electorate), a former parliamentary electorate, 1972–1996
West Coast Council, a local government area of Tasmania, Australia

Music
West Coast (album), a 2006 album by Swedish electronic band Studio
"West Coast" (Lana Del Rey song), 2014
"West Coast" (OneRepublic song), 2022
"West Coast", a song by Coconut Records (musician)
"West Coast", a song by G-Eazy from the soundtrack to the 2019 film Beats
"West Coast", a song by Imagine Dragons from their album Origins
"West Coast", a song by Ketty Lester, 1965
West Coast hip hop, a form of hip hop music in the United States that developed and originated in Los Angeles

Transport
West Coast Air, a scheduled and charter airline based in Vancouver
West Coast Choppers, a company selling chopper-style motorcycles in Texas (originally based in California)
West Coast Customs, a car remodeling company in California

Rail
Florida West Coast Railroad, a railroad running from Newberry to Trenton
West Coast Railway (disambiguation)
West Coast (train), former passenger train from Los Angeles to Portland, Oregon
West Coast Express, a commuter railway in British Columbia
West Coast Main Line, one of the main rail corridors in the United Kingdom
Avanti West Coast, current operator of the West Coast Main Line
West Coast Railways, a British railway charter train operator based in Carnforth, Lancashire
Western Railway zone, operating in parts of western coastal India

Other
West Coast Eagles, an Australian rules football club, also known as West Coast 
 West Coast (horse), an American racehorse
West Coast (TV series), a Canadian variety show

See also 
Chanel West Coast (born 1988), American entertainer
 History of the west coast of North America
Westcoast (disambiguation)
West Coast Avengers, a Marvel Comics superhero team
West Coast Computer Faire, a former computer industry conference
West Coast Conference, a US athletics league
West Coast League, US baseball league
West Coast liberal, a stereotype encountered in American political culture